The 1968 European Cup Winners' Cup Final was the final football match of the 1967–68 European Cup Winners' Cup and the eighth European Cup Winners' Cup final. It was contested between Milan of Italy and Hamburg of West Germany, and was held at Feijenoord Stadion in Rotterdam, Netherlands. Milan won the match 2–0 thanks to two goals by Kurt Hamrin.

Route to the final

Match

Details

See also
1968 European Cup Final
1968 Inter-Cities Fairs Cup Final
A.C. Milan in European football

External links
UEFA Cup Winners' Cup results at Rec.Sport.Soccer Statistics Foundation
1968 European Cup Winners' Cup Final at UEFA.com
Match report

3
A.C. Milan matches
Hamburger SV matches
1968
International club association football competitions hosted by the Netherlands
1967–68 in German football
1967–68 in Dutch football
1967–68 in Italian football
May 1968 sports events in Europe
Sports competitions in Rotterdam
20th century in Rotterdam